The 1973 Pittsburgh Pirates season was the 92nd season of the Pittsburgh Pirates franchise; the 87th in the National League. The Pirates finished third in the National League East with a record of 80–82.

Offseason 
 October 25, 1972: Gene Garber was traded by the Pirates to the Kansas City Royals for Jim Rooker.
 November 25, 1972: Dick Sharon was traded by the Pirates to the Detroit Tigers for Jim Foor and Norm McRae.
 December 31, 1972: Roberto Clemente was killed in an airplane crash.
 April 2, 1973: Charlie Sands was traded by the Pirates to the Detroit Tigers for Chris Zachary.

Regular season

Season standings

Record vs. opponents

Game log

|- bgcolor="ccffcc"
| 1 || April 6 || Cardinals || 7–5 || Rooker (1–0) || Segui || Hernandez (1) || 51,695 || 1–0
|- bgcolor="ccffcc"
| 2 || April 8 || Cardinals || 4–3 (10) || Giusti (1–0) || Granger || — ||  || 2–0
|- bgcolor="ccffcc"
| 3 || April 8 || Cardinals || 5–3 || Ellis (1–0) || Spinks || Hernandez (2) || 23,391 || 3–0
|- bgcolor="ccffcc"
| 4 || April 12 || Cubs || 6–0 || Moose (1–0) || Jenkins || — || 3,764 || 4–0
|- bgcolor="ffbbbb"
| 5 || April 14 || @ Expos || 4–6 || Walker || Briles (0–1) || — || 21,198 || 4–1
|- bgcolor="ccffcc"
| 6 || April 15 || @ Expos || 8–3 || Ellis (2–0) || Torrez || Giusti (1) || 12,101 || 5–1
|- bgcolor="ccffcc"
| 7 || April 17 || @ Cardinals || 4–3 (14) || Hernandez (1–0) || Foster || Rooker (1) || 9,851 || 6–1
|- bgcolor="ccffcc"
| 8 || April 18 || @ Cardinals || 8–2 || Moose (2–0) || Wise || Walker (1) || 6,228 || 7–1
|- bgcolor="ffbbbb"
| 9 || April 21 || @ Cubs || 9–10 || Locker || Briles (0–2) || — || 16,637 || 7–2
|- bgcolor="ccffcc"
| 10 || April 22 || @ Cubs || 10–4 || Ellis (3–0) || Pappas || Rooker (2) ||  || 8–2
|- bgcolor="ffbbbb"
| 11 || April 22 || @ Cubs || 3–11 || Gura || Blass (0–1) || Bonham || 28,271 || 8–3
|- bgcolor="ffbbbb"
| 12 || April 24 || Padres || 5–7 || Troedson || Moose (2–1) || Romo || 10,108 || 8–4
|- bgcolor="ffbbbb"
| 13 || April 28 || Dodgers || 2–3 || Sutton || Briles (0–3) || — || 9,643 || 8–5
|- bgcolor="ffbbbb"
| 14 || April 29 || Dodgers || 8–9 (13) || Downing || Hernandez (1–1) || — ||  || 8–6
|- bgcolor="ffbbbb"
| 15 || April 29 || Dodgers || 1–2 || Osteen || Ellis (3–1) || — || 18,083 || 8–7
|-

|- bgcolor="ffbbbb"
| 16 || May 1 || @ Giants || 7–8 || Sosa || Hernandez (1–2) || — || 7,972 || 8–8
|- bgcolor="ccffcc"
| 17 || May 2 || @ Giants || 2–1 || Walker (1–0) || Barr || Giusti (2) || 4,818 || 9–8
|- bgcolor="ccffcc"
| 18 || May 3 || @ Giants || 14–5 || Briles (1–3) || Willoughby || — || 4,198 || 10–8
|- bgcolor="ccffcc"
| 19 || May 4 || @ Padres || 12–6 || Blass (1–1) || Norman || — || 9,595 || 11–8
|- bgcolor="ffbbbb"
| 20 || May 5 || @ Padres || 5–6 || Romo || Ellis (3–2) || — || 10,619 || 11–9
|- bgcolor="ffbbbb"
| 21 || May 6 || @ Padres || 0–8 || Caldwell || Moose (2–2) || — || 7,176 || 11–10
|- bgcolor="ccffcc"
| 22 || May 7 || @ Dodgers || 5–4 || Johnson (1–0) || Sutton || Rooker (3) || 17,745 || 12–10
|- bgcolor="ffbbbb"
| 23 || May 8 || @ Dodgers || 4–7 || Messersmith || Briles (1–4) || Brewer || 13,620 || 12–11
|- bgcolor="ffbbbb"
| 24 || May 9 || @ Dodgers || 5–8 || Osteen || Blass (1–2) || Culver || 17,509 || 12–12
|- bgcolor="ffbbbb"
| 25 || May 11 || Mets || 3–4 || Parker || Ellis (3–3) || McGraw || 17,564 || 12–13
|- bgcolor="ffbbbb"
| 26 || May 12 || Mets || 0–6 || Seaver || Moose (2–3) || — || 13,058 || 12–14
|- bgcolor="ffbbbb"
| 27 || May 13 || Mets || 4–6 || McAndrew || Walker (1–1) || McGraw || 14,310 || 12–15
|- bgcolor="ffbbbb"
| 28 || May 14 || Expos || 2–3 (10) || Walker || Briles (1–5) || — || 6,327 || 12–16
|- bgcolor="ccffcc"
| 29 || May 15 || Expos || 9–8 (11) || Giusti (2–0) || Gilbert || — || 5,441 || 13–16
|- bgcolor="ffbbbb"
| 30 || May 16 || Phillies || 2–5 || Twitchell || Ellis (3–4) || Scarce || 6,885 || 13–17
|- bgcolor="ccffcc"
| 31 || May 17 || Phillies || 5–2 || Moose (3–3) || Carlton || Rooker (4) || 6,885 || 14–17
|- bgcolor="ffbbbb"
| 32 || May 18 || @ Mets || 3–4 || Seaver || Walker (1–2) || — || 34,565 || 14–18
|- bgcolor="ccffcc"
| 33 || May 19 || @ Mets || 4–1 (10) || Giusti (3–0) || McGraw || — || 32,622 || 15–18
|- bgcolor="ccffcc"
| 34 || May 21 || @ Phillies || 5–4 || Blass (2–2) || Scarce || Giusti (3) || 9,010 || 16–18
|- bgcolor="ffbbbb"
| 35 || May 22 || @ Phillies || 4–7 || Twitchell || Ellis (3–5) || — || 11,617 || 16–19
|- bgcolor="ffbbbb"
| 36 || May 25 || Astros || 2–7 || Reuss || Moose (3–4) || — || 13,956 || 16–20
|- bgcolor="ccffcc"
| 37 || May 26 || Astros || 7–2 || Briles (2–5) || Forsch || Giusti (4) || 15,768 || 17–20
|- bgcolor="ffbbbb"
| 38 || May 27 || Astros || 2–6 || Roberts || Blass (2–3) || — || 15,386 || 17–21
|- bgcolor="ccffcc"
| 39 || May 28 || Astros || 4–2 || Ellis (4–5) || Wilson || Giusti (5) || 21,546 || 18–21
|- bgcolor="ccffcc"
| 40 || May 29 || Braves || 6–1 || Walker (2–2) || Morton || Rooker (5) || 7,911 || 19–21
|- bgcolor="ccffcc"
| 41 || May 30 || Braves || 4–2 || Moose (4–4) || Reed || — || 7,963 || 20–21
|- bgcolor="ccffcc"
| 42 || May 31 || Braves || 3–1 || Briles (3–5) || Gentry || — || 10,446 || 21–21
|-

|- bgcolor="ccffcc"
| 43 || June 1 || Reds || 9–6 || Blass (3–3) || Sprague || Giusti (6) || 24,213 || 22–21
|- bgcolor="ccffcc"
| 44 || June 2 || Reds || 4–3 || Ellis (5–5) || Billingham || Giusti (7) || 19,212 || 23–21
|- bgcolor="ffbbbb"
| 45 || June 3 || Reds || 1–5 || Carroll || Walker (2–3) || Borbon || 22,450 || 23–22
|- bgcolor="ffbbbb"
| 46 || June 4 || Giants || 2–7 || Bradley || Moose (4–5) || — || 12,570 || 23–23
|- bgcolor="ffbbbb"
| 47 || June 5 || Giants || 2–3 || Bryant || Briles (3–6) || Moffitt || 14,975 || 23–24
|- bgcolor="ffbbbb"
| 48 || June 6 || Giants || 7–9 || Williams || Rooker (1–1) || Moffitt || 13,884 || 23–25
|- bgcolor="ffbbbb"
| 49 || June 8 || @ Astros || 3–4 || Forsch || Ellis (5–6) || Ray || 25,486 || 23–26
|- bgcolor="ccffcc"
| 50 || June 9 || @ Astros || 4–1 || Moose (5–5) || Wilson || — || 29,716 || 24–26
|- bgcolor="ffbbbb"
| 51 || June 10 || @ Astros || 1–7 || Reuss || Briles (3–7) || — || 23,057 || 24–27
|- bgcolor="ffbbbb"
| 52 || June 11 || @ Braves || 7–9 || Morton || Blass (3–4) || Schueler || 6,878 || 24–28
|- bgcolor="ffbbbb"
| 53 || June 12 || @ Braves || 2–4 || Niekro || Walker (2–4) || — || 10,418 || 24–29
|- bgcolor="ffbbbb"
| 54 || June 13 || @ Braves || 3–18 || Reed || Ellis (5–7) || — || 9,553 || 24–30
|- bgcolor="ffbbbb"
| 55 || June 15 || @ Reds || 0–6 || Norman || Moose (5–6) || — || 27,029 || 24–31
|- bgcolor="ccffcc"
| 56 || June 16 || @ Reds || 5–0 || Briles (4–7) || Gullett || — || 39,106 || 25–31
|- bgcolor="ffbbbb"
| 57 || June 17 || @ Reds || 1–3 || Billingham || Walker (2–5) || Hall ||  || 25–32
|- bgcolor="ffbbbb"
| 58 || June 17 || @ Reds || 1–5 || Grimsley || Dettore (0–1) || — || 50,232 || 25–33
|- bgcolor="ccffcc"
| 59 || June 18 || Cubs || 3–1 || Ellis (6–7) || Jenkins || — || 11,470 || 26–33
|- bgcolor="ffbbbb"
| 60 || June 19 || Cubs || 3–6 || Gura || Johnson (1–1) || Aker ||  || 26–34
|- bgcolor="ccffcc"
| 61 || June 19 || Cubs || 4–3 || Giusti (4–0) || Locker || — || 28,256 || 27–34
|- bgcolor="ffbbbb"
| 62 || June 20 || Cubs || 3–5 || Reuschel || Briles (4–8) || Aker || 17,895 || 27–35
|- bgcolor="ccffcc"
| 63 || June 21 || Mets || 2–1 || Walker (3–5) || Capra || — || 10,099 || 28–35
|- bgcolor="ffbbbb"
| 64 || June 22 || Mets || 4–5 || Stone || Blass (3–5) || — || 21,129 || 28–36
|- bgcolor="ccffcc"
| 65 || June 23 || Mets || 3–2 (10) || Hernandez (2–2) || Hennigan || — || 24,337 || 29–36
|- bgcolor="ffbbbb"
| 66 || June 24 || Mets || 2–5 || Seaver || Moose (5–7) || — || 20,984 || 29–37
|- bgcolor="ccffcc"
| 67 || June 25 || @ Expos || 8–6 || Giusti (5–0) || McAnally || — ||  || 30–37
|- bgcolor="ccffcc"
| 68 || June 25 || @ Expos || 3–1 || Briles (5–8) || Strohmayer || — || 24,402 || 31–37
|- bgcolor="ffbbbb"
| 69 || June 26 || @ Expos || 3–10 || Stoneman || Walker (3–6) || Marshall || 12,806 || 31–38
|- bgcolor="ffbbbb"
| 70 || June 27 || Cardinals || 4–15 || Cleveland || Rooker (1–2) || — || 33,041 || 31–39
|- bgcolor="ccffcc"
| 71 || June 28 || Cardinals || 6–0 || Ellis (7–7) || Wise || — || 34,471 || 32–39
|- bgcolor="ccffcc"
| 72 || June 29 || Expos || 4–0 || Moose (6–7) || McAnally || — || 26,638 || 33–39
|- bgcolor="ccffcc"
| 73 || June 30 || Expos || 5–1 || Briles (6–8) || Moore || Hernandez (3) || 11,676 || 34–39
|-

|- bgcolor="ccffcc"
| 74 || July 1 || Expos || 6–2 || Walker (4–6) || Stoneman || Johnson (1) ||  || 35–39
|- bgcolor="ccffcc"
| 75 || July 1 || Expos || 8–4 || Rooker (2–2) || Torrez || Giusti (8) || 24,984 || 36–39
|- bgcolor="ffbbbb"
| 76 || July 3 || @ Cardinals || 0–4 || Wise || Ellis (7–8) || — ||  || 36–40
|- bgcolor="ffbbbb"
| 77 || July 3 || @ Cardinals || 6–7 || Folkers || Blass (3–6) || Segui || 28,449 || 36–41
|- bgcolor="ffbbbb"
| 78 || July 4 || @ Cardinals || 3–11 || Murphy || Moose (6–8) || — || 12,671 || 36–42
|- bgcolor="ccffcc"
| 79 || July 5 || @ Cardinals || 3–2 || Briles (7–8) || Pena || — || 14,652 || 37–42
|- bgcolor="ffbbbb"
| 80 || July 6 || @ Dodgers || 2–3 || Sutton || Walker (4–7) || — || 28,011 || 37–43
|- bgcolor="ffbbbb"
| 81 || July 7 || @ Dodgers || 6–8 || Rau || Lamb (0–1) || Brewer || 33,197 || 37–44
|- bgcolor="ffbbbb"
| 82 || July 8 || @ Dodgers || 2–3 (12) || Richert || Giusti (5–1) || — || 24,144 || 37–45
|- bgcolor="ccffcc"
| 83 || July 10 || @ Padres || 4–3 || Johnson (2–1) || Troedson || Lamb (1) || 12,233 || 38–45
|- bgcolor="ccffcc"
| 84 || July 11 || @ Padres || 10–2 || Briles (8–8) || Arlin || — || 4,763 || 39–45
|- bgcolor="ccffcc"
| 85 || July 12 || @ Padres || 4–0 || Walker (5–7) || Kirby || — || 2,865 || 40–45
|- bgcolor="ffbbbb"
| 86 || July 13 || @ Giants || 2–5 || Bradley || Ellis (7–9) || — || 10,842 || 40–46
|- bgcolor="ccffcc"
| 87 || July 14 || @ Giants || 7–2 || Rooker (3–2) || Bryant || — || 9,458 || 41–46
|- bgcolor="ffbbbb"
| 88 || July 15 || @ Giants || 0–12 || Marichal || Moose (6–9) || — || 12,851 || 41–47
|- bgcolor="ffbbbb"
| 89 || July 16 || Dodgers || 0–1 || Sutton || Briles (8–9) || — || 16,570 || 41–48
|- bgcolor="ffbbbb"
| 90 || July 17 || Dodgers || 4–8 || Messersmith || Walker (5–8) || Brewer || 17,389 || 41–49
|- bgcolor="ccffcc"
| 91 || July 18 || Dodgers || 3–2 || Ellis (8–9) || John || Giusti (9) || 24,248 || 42–49
|- bgcolor="ccffcc"
| 92 || July 20 || Padres || 5–4 (10) || Giusti (6–1) || Caldwell || — ||  || 43–49
|- bgcolor="ccffcc"
| 93 || July 20 || Padres || 7–0 || Rooker (4–2) || Troedson || — || 25,832 || 44–49
|- bgcolor="ccffcc"
| 94 || July 22 || Padres || 3–1 || Briles (9–9) || Arlin || Giusti (10) ||  || 45–49
|- bgcolor="ccffcc"
| 95 || July 22 || Padres || 13–7 || Walker (6–8) || Kirby || Lamb (2) || 22,425 || 46–49
|- bgcolor="ccffcc"
| 96 || July 26 || @ Cubs || 3–2 || Ellis (9–9) || Reuschel || Giusti (11) || 35,770 || 47–49
|- bgcolor="ccffcc"
| 97 || July 27 || @ Cubs || 10–6 || Briles (10–9) || Gura || Giusti (12) || 22,045 || 48–49
|- bgcolor="ffbbbb"
| 98 || July 28 || Phillies || 0–5 || Twitchell || Rooker (4–3) || — || 14,630 || 48–50
|- bgcolor="ccffcc"
| 99 || July 29 || Phillies || 5–2 || Hernandez (3–2) || Ruthven || — ||  || 49–50
|- bgcolor="ccffcc"
| 100 || July 29 || Phillies || 5–2 || Walker (7–8) || Lersch || Giusti (13) || 26,947 || 50–50
|- bgcolor="ffbbbb"
| 101 || July 30 || Phillies || 0–1 || Carlton || Moose (6–10) || — || 17,220 || 50–51
|- bgcolor="ccffcc"
| 102 || July 31 || @ Mets || 4–1 || Ellis (10–9) || Koosman || Hernandez (4) || 24,322 || 51–51
|-

|- bgcolor="ffbbbb"
| 103 || August 1 || @ Mets || 0–3 || Seaver || Blass (3–7) || — ||  || 51–52
|- bgcolor="ffbbbb"
| 104 || August 1 || @ Mets || 2–5 || Stone || Briles (10–10) || Parker || 27,189 || 51–53
|- bgcolor="ffbbbb"
| 105 || August 2 || @ Mets || 1–5 || Sadecki || Rooker (4–4) || McGraw || 13,429 || 51–54
|- bgcolor="ccffcc"
| 106 || August 3 || @ Phillies || 3–1 || Morlan (1–0) || Carlton || Hernandez (5) || 24,152 || 52–54
|- bgcolor="ffbbbb"
| 107 || August 4 || @ Phillies || 5–11 || Brett || Walker (7–9) || — ||  || 52–55
|- bgcolor="ccffcc"
| 108 || August 4 || @ Phillies || 11–4 || Hernandez (4–2) || Lonborg || — || 48,294 || 53–55
|- bgcolor="ccffcc"
| 109 || August 5 || @ Phillies || 4–1 || Ellis (11–9) || Twitchell || Giusti (14) || 31,157 || 54–55
|- bgcolor="ffbbbb"
| 110 || August 7 || Astros || 0–2 || Wilson || Briles (10–11) || — || 13,841 || 54–56
|- bgcolor="ccffcc"
| 111 || August 8 || Astros || 4–3 || Rooker (5–4) || Roberts || Johnson (2) || 15,745 || 55–56
|- bgcolor="ffbbbb"
| 112 || August 10 || Braves || 4–5 || Niekro || Ellis (11–10) || — || 25,781 || 55–57
|- bgcolor="ffbbbb"
| 113 || August 11 || Braves || 3–9 || Harrison || Morlan (1–1) || House || 21,365 || 55–58
|- bgcolor="ccffcc"
| 114 || August 12 || Braves || 5–2 || Moose (7–10) || Schueler || — || 28,718 || 56–58
|- bgcolor="ccffcc"
| 115 || August 13 || Reds || 3–2 || Briles (11–11) || Norman || Giusti (15) || 15,396 || 57–58
|- bgcolor="ffbbbb"
| 116 || August 14 || Reds || 4–5 || Carroll || Hernandez (4–3) || Hall || 17,841 || 57–59
|- bgcolor="ffbbbb"
| 117 || August 15 || Reds || 0–1 || Billingham || Ellis (11–11) || — || 20,903 || 57–60
|- bgcolor="ffbbbb"
| 118 || August 17 || Giants || 3–5 || Bryant || Moose (7–11) || Sosa || 15,789 || 57–61
|- bgcolor="ccffcc"
| 119 || August 18 || Giants || 6–5 || Briles (12–11) || Barr || Giusti (16) || 19,569 || 58–61
|- bgcolor="ccffcc"
| 120 || August 19 || Giants || 5–0 || Rooker (6–4) || Marichal || — || 23,640 || 59–61
|- bgcolor="ffbbbb"
| 121 || August 20 || @ Astros || 2–10 || Richard || Ellis (11–12) || — || 11,057 || 59–62
|- bgcolor="ccffcc"
| 122 || August 21 || @ Astros || 6–3 || Morlan (2–1) || Wilson || — || 11,094 || 60–62
|- bgcolor="ccffcc"
| 123 || August 22 || @ Astros || 4–0 || Moose (8–11) || Griffin || — || 10,746 || 61–62
|- bgcolor="ffbbbb"
| 124 || August 24 || @ Braves || 2–3 || Devine || Giusti (6–2) || — || 15,680 || 61–63
|- bgcolor="ccffcc"
| 125 || August 25 || @ Braves || 6–5 (11) || Giusti (7–2) || Neibauer || — || 20,103 || 62–63
|- bgcolor="ffbbbb"
| 126 || August 26 || @ Braves || 6–8 || Harrison || Ellis (11–13) || Devine || 26,113 || 62–64
|- bgcolor="ccffcc"
| 127 || August 28 || @ Reds || 8–3 || Moose (9–11) || Grimsley || Johnson (3) || 31,729 || 63–64
|- bgcolor="ffbbbb"
| 128 || August 29 || @ Reds || 3–5 || Billingham || Briles (12–12) || — || 30,032 || 63–65
|- bgcolor="ccffcc"
| 129 || August 31 || Cubs || 7–0 || Rooker (7–4) || Reuschel || — ||  || 64–65
|- bgcolor="ccffcc"
| 130 || August 31 || Cubs || 5–2 || Johnson (3–1) || Jenkins || Hernandez (6) || 35,884 || 65–65
|-

|- bgcolor="ccffcc"
| 131 || September 1 || Cubs || 1–0 || Giusti (8–2) || Hooton || — || 13,484 || 66–65
|- bgcolor="ffbbbb"
| 132 || September 2 || Cubs || 3–5 || Locker || Hernandez (4–4) || — || 19,130 || 66–66
|- bgcolor="ccffcc"
| 133 || September 3 || Cardinals || 5–4 (13) || Giusti (9–2) || Fisher || — ||  || 67–66
|- bgcolor="ffbbbb"
| 134 || September 3 || Cardinals || 3–8 || Folkers || Walker (7–10) || Pena || 43,839 || 67–67
|- bgcolor="ffbbbb"
| 135 || September 4 || Cardinals || 2–4 || Andrews || Rooker (7–5) || Hrabosky || 16,280 || 67–68
|- bgcolor="ffbbbb"
| 136 || September 5 || Cardinals || 3–5 || Foster || Morlan (2–2) || Segui || 18,894 || 67–69
|- bgcolor="ccffcc"
| 137 || September 7 || @ Phillies || 10–8 || Johnson (4–1) || Scarce || Hernandez (7) || 15,233 || 68–69
|- bgcolor="ccffcc"
| 138 || September 8 || @ Phillies || 5–3 || Moose (10–11) || Carlton || Giusti (17) || 16,320 || 69–69
|- bgcolor="ffbbbb"
| 139 || September 9 || @ Phillies || 7–8 || Scarce || Johnson (4–2) || — || 14,356 || 69–70
|- bgcolor="ccffcc"
| 140 || September 10 || @ Cubs || 11–3 || Rooker (8–5) || Reuschel || — || 7,255 || 70–70
|- bgcolor="ffbbbb"
| 141 || September 11 || @ Cubs || 0–2 || Hooton || Blass (3–8) || — || 8,516 || 70–71
|- bgcolor="ccffcc"
| 142 || September 12 || @ Cubs || 4–2 || Kison (1–0) || Paul || Giusti (18) || 9,857 || 71–71
|- bgcolor="ccffcc"
| 143 || September 13 || @ Cubs || 6–1 || Moose (11–11) || Pappas || Hernandez (8) || 7,375 || 72–71
|- bgcolor="ccffcc"
| 144 || September 14 || @ Cardinals || 3–1 || Briles (13–12) || Cleveland || Hernandez (9) || 32,630 || 73–71
|- bgcolor="ccffcc"
| 145 || September 15 || @ Cardinals || 7–4 || Rooker (9–5) || Nagy || Hernandez (10) || 28,219 || 74–71
|- bgcolor="ffbbbb"
| 146 || September 16 || @ Cardinals || 3–7 || Foster || Walker (7–11) || Hrabosky || 31,938 || 74–72
|- bgcolor="ccffcc"
| 147 || September 17 || Mets || 10–3 || Kison (2–0) || Seaver || Zachary (1) || 15,000 || 75–72
|- bgcolor="ffbbbb"
| 148 || September 18 || Mets || 5–6 || McGraw || Hernandez (4–5) || Capra || 12,336 || 75–73
|- bgcolor="ffbbbb"
| 149 || September 19 || @ Mets || 3–7 || Stone || Briles (13–13) || McGraw || 29,240 || 75–74
|- bgcolor="ffbbbb"
| 150 || September 20 || @ Mets || 3–4 (13) || Sadecki || Walker (7–12) || — || 24,855 || 75–75
|- bgcolor="ffbbbb"
| 151 || September 21 || @ Mets || 2–10 || Seaver || Blass (3–9) || — || 51,381 || 75–76
|- bgcolor="ccffcc"
| 152 || September 23 || @ Expos || 6–3 || Kison (3–0) || Stoneman || Hernandez (11) ||  || 76–76
|- bgcolor="ccffcc"
| 153 || September 23 || @ Expos || 7–4 || Ellis (12–13) || Torrez || Giusti (19) || 26,178 || 77–76
|- bgcolor="ffbbbb"
| 154 || September 24 || @ Expos || 4–5 || Renko || Moose (11–12) || Marshall ||  || 77–77
|- bgcolor="ccffcc"
| 155 || September 24 || @ Expos || 3–0 || Briles (14–13) || McAnally || Giusti (20) || 20,168 || 78–77
|- bgcolor="ffbbbb"
| 156 || September 25 || Phillies || 1–2 || Carlton || Rooker (9–6) || — || 13,312 || 78–78
|- bgcolor="ccffcc"
| 157 || September 26 || Phillies || 13–2 || Moose (12–12) || Lonborg || Johnson (4) || 8,991 || 79–78
|- bgcolor="ffbbbb"
| 158 || September 27 || Phillies || 2–3 (13) || Culver || Zachary (0–1) || Wallace || 11,577 || 79–79
|- bgcolor="ffbbbb"
| 159 || September 28 || Expos || 2–3 || Marshall || Ellis (12–14) || — || 27,804 || 79–80
|- bgcolor="ffbbbb"
| 160 || September 29 || Expos || 4–6 || Rogers || McKee (0–1) || Marshall || 9,816 || 79–81
|- bgcolor="ccffcc"
| 161 || September 30 || Expos || 10–2 || Rooker (10–6) || McAnally || — || 33,376 || 80–81
|-

|- bgcolor="ffbbbb"
| 162 || October 1 || Padres || 3–4 || Jones || Moose (12–13) || Corkins || 2,572 || 80–82
|-

|-
| Legend:       = Win       = LossBold = Pirates team member

Opening Day lineup

Notable transactions 
 May 4, 1973: Jerry McNertney was purchased by the Pirates from the Oakland Athletics.
 May 24, 1973: Chuck Goggin was sold by the Pirates to the Atlanta Braves.
 June 5, 1973: Steve Nicosia was chosen by the Pirates in the 1st round of the 1973 Major League Baseball draft.
 June 17, 1973: Rick Langford was signed as an amateur free agent by the Pirates.
 July 5, 1973: Jerry McNertney was released by the Pirates.
 July 7, 1973: Dal Maxvill was purchased by the Pirates from the Oakland Athletics.
 July 31, 1973: Vic Davalillo was sold by the Pirates to the Oakland Athletics.
 September 7, 1973: Bill Virdon was fired as Manager of the Pirates, replaced by Danny Murtaugh.

Roster

Player stats

Batting

Starters by position 
Note: Pos = Position; G = Games played; AB = At bats; H = Hits; Avg. = Batting average; HR = Home runs; RBI = Runs batted in

Other batters 
Note: G = Games played; AB = At bats; H = Hits; Avg. = Batting average; HR = Home runs; RBI = Runs batted in

Pitching

Starting pitchers 
Note: G = Games pitched; IP = Innings pitched; W = Wins; L = Losses; ERA = Earned run average; SO = Strikeouts

Other pitchers 
Note: G = Games pitched; IP = Innings pitched; W = Wins; L = Losses; ERA = Earned run average; SO = Strikeouts

Relief pitchers 
Note: G = Games pitched; W = Wins; L = Losses; SV = Saves; ERA = Earned run average; SO = Strikeouts

Awards and honors 

1973 Major League Baseball All-Star Game

Farm system

Notes

References 
 1973 Pittsburgh Pirates at Baseball Reference
 1973 Pittsburgh Pirates at Baseball Almanac

Pittsburgh Pirates seasons
Pittsburgh Pirates season
Pittsburg